In civil engineering and construction, the neat volume is a theoretical amount of material.

For earthworks, it can refer to the volume either before native material is disturbed by excavation, or after placement and compaction is complete. A percentage is typically added to neat volume to estimate loose (i.e. uncompacted) volumes for procurement purposes.

With concrete work, neat volume is calculated assuming there is no bowing in the formwork, or, for cast-in-place concrete, that the surfaces in contact with the concrete have no voids or imperfections that would require a greater volume of concrete to fill.

Civil engineering